Wyche Island is a small island just south of the west end of Burnett Island in the Swain Islands. This region was photographed from the air by U.S. Navy Operation Highjump (1946–47), ANARE (Australian National Antarctic Research Expeditions) (1956), and the Soviet expedition (1956). The island was included in a 1957 ground survey by C.R. Eklund. He named it for aerographer's mate Paul A. Wyche, U.S. Navy, a member of the Wilkes Station party, 1957.

See also 
 Composite Antarctic Gazetteer
 List of Antarctic and sub-Antarctic islands
 List of Antarctic islands south of 60° S
 SCAR
 Territorial claims in Antarctica

References

External links 

Islands of Wilkes Land